Anka year ( Aṅka) system is a unique regnal year system used in the state of Odisha, India and was instituted by the rulers of the Eastern Ganga dynasty for dating their reigns. It had a number of features that mark the regnal year different from that actual duration of the year elapsed during the reign. The system still survives today and is used in the Odia calendar (panji) to mark the titular regnal year of the Gajapati Maharaja (King of Puri) which is currently held by Divyasingha Deva IV of the Bhoi dynasty, whose title carries the legacy of the historical ruling monarchs of Odisha.

Description
The Anka system, also denoted as the Odisha style of dating refers to a special system of counting used only in Odisha which is written along with the name of the King of Puri accompanied by a simple calculation which yields the regnal year of the king. The Anka years were so popular in the Odia-speaking tracts that not only it was used in official records but also by the authors in their works and in the horoscopes prepared by the astrologers. Additional information are also provided on the lunar or solar date besides the King's Anka with the Odia calendar following the Purnimanta system of month naming.

Features
 The Anka system always starts on the Odia fiscal new year called Sunia which falls on the 12th day of the bright fortnight of the month Bhadra (August-September) known as Bhādra Sukḷa Dwādasi. If the king accedes the throne for a few days before this date, then the first year of his reign would then just be a few days long.
 Coins were minted on the date of the new year and hence the first coins were given the Anka year 2, the number 1 was not used.
 All years ending in 6 were skipped. As in the Anka year 5 was followed by Anka year 7, Anka year 15 was followed by Anka year 17 and so on.
 All years ending in 0 were also skipped, except for the Anka year 10.
Hence no Anka years exist for 1, 6, 16, 20, 26, 30, 36, 40, 46, 50, 56 and so on.

Regnal and Anka year Timeline

Anka year of the current titular Gajapati Maharaja

List of Anka year for monarchs of the ruling dynasties

Eastern Ganga dynasty

Suryavamsa (Routray) dynasty

Bhoi dynasty (1st reign)

Chalukya dynasty

Bhoi dynasty (2nd reign, Khurda-Puri)

References

Calendar eras
Time in India
Odia culture